Janez Detd. (short for Janez Determined) is a Belgian pop punk band that formed in 1995.

Band members 
Nikolas Van der Veken (Bones, Bientjes) – lead guitar and lead vocals
Bram Steemans (The Machine) – drums
Joeri Van Vaerenbergh – bass guitar and backing vocals
Wim Vanhenden – guitar, backing vocals
Brecht Claesen – percussions, backing vocals
Pieter Dubois – trombone, guitar
Yorgi Gritzelis – saxophone, guitar, backing vocals
Gunter Callewaert – keys, samples
Thadeus Jolie – trumpet
Marieke Fierens – backing vocals

Former members
Joeri Van Vaerenbergh – bass guitar, backing vocals/screams
Lennart Bossu – guitar, backing vocals
Wim Vanhenden – guitar, backing vocals
Bob Haentjens – bass guitar, backing vocals
Thijs De Cloedt – guitar, backing vocals
Tim Toegaert (Tammy, Ambi) – lead guitar, backing vocals
Thomas Maes - bass guitar, backing vocals

Discography

CDs 
Dignity And Teeth (maxi-CD, Green Leaf Records, 1996)
Bleenies And Blockheads (CD, I Scream Records, 1998)
Janez Detd. (CD, Cabalero/Virgin, 2000)
Anti-Anthem (CD, Cabalero/Virgin, 2003)
Killing Me (2005)
Like Cold Rain Kills A Summer Day (2006)
For Better For Worse (2008)
15 Years Of Fame (2009)

Special editions 
Bleenies And Blockheads (Japanese version)
Anti-Anthem (Japanese version)

Singles 
"Walk Away"
"Beaver Fever"
"Saturday"
"Rock On"
"Take On Me"
"Lisa (She's A Herpie)"
"Summer's Gone"
"Anti-Anthem"
"Mala Vida"
"Alright"
"Raise Your Fist"
"Killing Me"
"Deep"
"Your Love"
"Not OK"

Tracks on compilations 
Alright – De Afrekening (Vol. 33) (2004)
Anti-Anthem – Bel 2000 (2000 > 2004) (2009)
Anti-Anthem – The Attack Of The Flaming Penguin (2003)
Anti-Anthem – De Afrekening (Vol. 29) (2002)
Beaver Fever – Midem 1999 (1999)
Beaver Fever – Ready To Scroll (1998)
Beaver Fever – Het beste uit de Belpop van 1998 (2006)
Beaver Fever – 't Gaat Vooruit '98 (1998)
Deep – De Afrekening (Vol. 38) (2005)
Dispicable – The Best Of Belgium: Belgium's Best Punk Bands! (1996)
Dorkshire – 5 Years Of Blood, Sweat and Tears (1999)
Inferior – Teneramunda (1994)
Jealous – The best Of Belgium: Belgium's Best Punk Bands! (1996)
Killing Me – I Scream Summer Sampler '06 (2006)
Killing Me – De Afrekening (Vol. 37) (2005)
Kung-Fu vs To-fu – Elements (1999)
Lisa (She's A Herpie) – Humo's Alle 2000 Goed (2000)
Mala vida – De Afrekening (Vol. 31) (2003)
Ne Me Quitte Pas – Puur Brel (2003)
Need Some Time – Te Gek?! (Vol. 2) (2006)
Not OK – Converse – The Mixtape (Vol. 1) (2010)
Raise Your Fist – De Afrekening (Vol. 30) (2003)
Rock On! (Debbie's A Spaz!) – Labels Sampler (2000)
Rock On! (Debbie's A Spaz!) – Experience Music (2001)
Rock On! (Debbie's A Spaz!) – Great Rock And Pop Music From Flanders (2001)
Summer's Gone – Bel 2000 (2000 > 2004) (2009)
Take On Me – Hit Club (2000.4) (2000)
Take On Me – Bel 2000 (2000 > 2004) (2009)
Veggie – The best Of Belgium: Belgium's Best Punk Bands! (1996)

Track listing

Dignity And Teeth
Pervert Jay
Jealous
Rockstar Stress
Victim

Bleenies And Blockheads
Hidden Track 
Kung Fu vs Tofu
Beaver Fever
Fake P
U.Z.O.
Saturday
Dorkshire
Bunani (instrumental)
Walk Away
So Thin
Nursing
Kool
Victim

Janez Detd.
Kick Off
Angeline
Rock On!
Going Mental
Old Enough
Hey Myron!
Roy Rogers (instrumental)
Take On Me
Ferdy
Lisa (She's A Herpie)
Summer's Gone (And So Is Q107 FM)
Heins 57
Hidden track
Bloopers

Anti-Anthems
Raise Your Fist
Class of '92
Anti-Anthem
Individuality
Falling (Will I Ever Come Across Another You?)
Kids Today
Blame
Alright
Don't Forget
Major Mistake
FM Invasion
Mala Vida
Tonight
Dead End

Killing Me
The Tide Rises (instrumental)
Killing Me (II)
Deep
Killing Me (I)
In These Days
Crossed Your Heart
Fires To Come
Die For You
Lack Of Shame
Death Alone (From Death Can Save)
Breaking The Waves
Killing Me (III)
Until The End Of The World (I Will Always Love You)
The One

Like Cold Rain Kills A Summer Day
Killing Me (II)
Anti-Anthem
Deep
In These Days
Killing Me (I)
Raise Your Fist
Alright
Crossed Your Heart
Die For You
Kids Today
Breaking The Waves
FM Invasion
Fires To Come
Mala Vida

For Better For Worse
For Better For Worse
My Life/My Way
Without You
You!
Broken
Goodbye
I Hate You (Yes, I'm Judging You!)
Take 5 (How To Survive High School Without Any Real Friends)
Your Love (I Don't Wanna Lose Tonight)
Hilmont High School (I Pledge Allegiance To JD)
Never Last (All Our Friends Hate Us For This)
1983
The Truth (Please Give Me Some Truth)
I Want You

15 Years Of Fame
Beaver Fever
Saturday
Rock On
Lisa
Take On Me
Summer's Gone
Anti-Anthem
Raise Your Fist
Mala Vida
Alright
Killing Me
Deep
Breaking The Waves
Crossed Your Heart
Your Love (live)

Bleenies And Blockheads (Japanese version)
?

Anti-Anthems (Japanese version)
Raise Your Fist
Class Of '92
Anti-Anthem
Individuality
Falling (Will I Ever Come Across Another You?)
Kids Today
Blame
Alright (One More Shot)
Don't Forger
Major Mistake
FM Invasion
Mala Vida
Tonight
Dead End
Rock On (live)
Anti-Anthem (live)

External links

Official website Janez Detd. Circo

Pop punk groups